The Arctic skate (Amblyraja hyperborea) is a species of fish in the family Rajidae. It lives near the seabed between 140 and 2,500 m deep in the Arctic Ocean and waters around Canada and northern and north-western Europe, in the northern Pacific Ocean, and in waters surrounding Antarctica and New Zealand.

The Arctic skate is about 1 m long and is gray-brown with large dark spots. Its underside is white with dark patterns. It has thorns in line from back to near the end of its tail. It is oviparous; its eggs are capsules with hard horns on each corner. It eats all sorts of small animals at the bottom of the sea.

Taxonomy 
This species was first described by Robert Collett in 1879 and named Raja hyperborea.

Conservation 
The Arctic skate is classified as being of "least concern" by the IUCN Red List of Threatened Species.

In New Zealand, the Department of Conservation has classified the Arctic skate as "Not Threatened" under the New Zealand Threat Classification System.

References

Amblyraja
Fish described in 1879
Fish of New Zealand
Taxa named by Robert Collett